Safer is a surname. Notable people with the surname include:

Jeanne Safer (born 1947), American psychotherapist and writer
John Safer (1922–2018), American sculptor
Morley Safer (1931–2016), Canadian-American television journalist
Tolga Safer (born 1982), British actor